Brandon Maye (born March 28, 1989) was an American football linebacker at Clemson University. He also attended Mississippi State University after graduating from Clemson.

High school career
A native of Mobile, Alabama, Maye attended Davidson High School, where he had 120 tackles, 18 tackles for loss, five sacks, two interceptions, and five recovered fumbles as a senior. He was a first-team all-region pick and was selected to the Alabama-Mississippi All-Star game.

Considered a three-star recruit by Rivals.com, Maye was ranked No. 29 among the top prospects from Alabama. However, he was overlooked by both Alabama and Auburn. Maye eventually chose Clemson over Memphis, South Carolina, and Southern Miss.

College career
After redshirting in 2007, Maye started twelve games for the Tigers in 2008, and recorded 87 tackles, the most by a Clemson freshman since Anthony Simmons had 150 in 1995. With his tackle total he also led all Atlantic Coast Conference freshmen in 2008. Maye also registered five tackles for loss, two sacks and nine quarterback pressures.

Maye subsequently earned All-Freshman honors, as he was named to FWAA′s Freshman All-America team and College Football News′ All-Freshman second team.

After finishing his sociology degree at Clemson, Maye transferred to Mississippi State to play his final season, while enrolling in MSU's sports administration graduate program.

References

External links
Mississippi State Bulldogs bio
Clemson Tigers bio

1989 births
Living people
Sportspeople from Mobile, Alabama
American football linebackers
Clemson Tigers football players
Mississippi State Bulldogs football players
Players of American football from Alabama